The Beijing–Qinhuangdao railway, also known as the Jingqin Line is a branch railway which connects the capital of China, Beijing, with the coastal city of Qinhuangdao.

History
The Jingqin railway was built from 1982 to 1985 with development assistance financing from Japan.

Cities 
The railway passes through the following cities:
 Beijing
 Tianjin
 Hebei: Tangshan, Qinhuangdao

Connecting railways 
After departing the Beijing railway station, the line branches off to form the Beijing–Shanhaiguan railway, a railway which ends at the Shanhaiguan District of Qinhuangdao.  Also in the urban area of Beijing, the line intersects with both Beijing–Baotou and Fengtai–Shacheng railways. The line then breaks off again to form the Beijing–Chengde railway to the north.  The railway is also one of the three lines which comprise the Beijing–Harbin railway. The Datong–Qinhuangdao Railway also intersects with the Beijing–Qinhuangdao line in Beijing.

In Tianjin, the line crosses with the Tianjin–Jizhou railway. Then in Harbin the line intersects with the Tangshan–Zunhua railway before crossing over a few times with the Beijing–Shanhaiguan railway. Finally, the two lines join together in Qinhuangdao to enter the Shanhaiguan District.

References

Sources Cited

See also 

 Rail transport in China
 List of railways in China

Railway lines in China
Rail transport in Beijing
Rail transport in Tianjin
Rail transport in Hebei